Maqsudlu (also Romanized as Maqşūdlū) is a village in Bedevostan-e Sharqi Rural District, in the Central District of Heris County, East Azerbaijan Province, Iran. At the 2006 census, its population was 614, in 150 families.

References 

Populated places in Heris County